Mary Nell Santacroce (née McKoin; May 25, 1918 – February 17, 1999) was an American actress. She has appeared in such films as Wise Blood (1979), The War (1994) and Something to Talk About (1995).  She was the mother of actress Dana Ivey.

Biography
Mary Nell McKoin was born in Atlanta, Georgia, in 1918. She was a graduate of both the University of Georgia and Emory University. From 1948-65, she taught speech and drama at the Georgia Institute of Technology. She also taught at Georgia State University from 1965 until 1972.

She had two children, daughter Dana and son John, from her marriage to Hugh Ivey, which ended in divorce. She had another son, Eric, from her marriage to Dante Santacroce, her widower.

Santacroce died on February 17, 1999, at her home in Atlanta from leukemia and bone cancer.

Select filmography
Wise Blood (1979)
The Private Eyes (1980)
Mutant (1984)
Impure Thoughts (1986)
Not Without My Daughter (1991)
Alex Haley's Queen (1993)
Silent Cries (1993)
Class of '61 (1993)
The Yearling (1994)
A Simple Twist of Fate (1994)
The War (1994)
Something to Talk About (1995)

References

External links

1918 births
1999 deaths
Deaths from leukemia
Deaths from bone cancer
Deaths from cancer in Georgia (U.S. state)
Actresses from Atlanta
American film actresses
American stage actresses
American television actresses
University of Georgia alumni
Emory University alumni
Georgia Tech faculty
Georgia State University faculty
20th-century American actresses
American women academics